Bedi Mahal, locally known as Babay Da Mehal, is a palace situated in Kallar Syedan some 40 kilometres away from Islamabad in Rawalpindi District, Punjab, Pakistan.

History
The palace was built by a Sikh spiritual and political leader who was the direct descendant, in the fourteenth place, of Sri Guru Nanak, Baba Khem Singh Bedi in the later half of the 19th century. After the partition of Punjab, it was turned into a school, named Government Boys High School Kallar Syedan.

See also 
 List of palaces in Pakistan

References

External links
The Lost Palace
Pictures

Palaces in Pakistan
Buildings and structures in Punjab, Pakistan
Rawalpindi District
Kallar Syedan Tehsil